Diamond Bear Brewing Company is a beer brewery located in North Little Rock, Arkansas.  Diamond Bear derives its name from the fact Arkansas is the only state in the United States where diamonds are naturally found, and the fact Arkansas was once known as The Bear State.

The Diamond Bear Brewery is also a prime tourist attraction offering tours to beer lovers visiting Arkansas.

Diamond Bear started brewing on September 21, 2000, founded by Russ and Sue Melton.  Up to that point, Arkansas did not have a commercial brewery within its borders.

In March 2009, Diamond Bear doubled its production capacity with help from the Arkansas Economic Development Commission.

External links
Diamond Bear Brewery

Beer brewing companies based in Arkansas
Companies based in Little Rock, Arkansas
Manufacturing companies based in Arkansas